The 1961 UK & Ireland Greyhound Racing Year was the 35th year of greyhound racing in the United Kingdom and Ireland.

Roll of honour

Summary
The Betting and Gaming Act 1960 came into force on 1 January 1961. The effect was almost instantaneous with afternoon attendances collapsing. In an attempt to combat the decline, the National Greyhound Racing Society banned telephones at the track and did not allow results to be published before 9.00 pm. In addition they attempted delaying trap draws and enforced a copyright on the tote returns but the government legislation had effectively handed over the afternoon track trade to the bookmaker industry.

Bizarrely the government handed horse racing a levy (a deduction from bookmaker's turnover that would be paid back to the racecourses), under the Betting Levy Act 1961. The levy was given because of the losses that horse racing would incur with daytime bookmakers shops opening. Greyhound racing was not given a levy which came as a further blow to the industry. Knowle Stadium, Stanley Greyhound Stadium (Liverpool) and Woodhouse Lane Stadium all closed.

Tracks
The opening meeting was held at Poole football stadium on 8 May. A track was also added around the County Ground, Taunton despite an initial betting licence refusal. The Sheffield Corporation took over Owlerton Stadium with a £185,000 offer and converted the three private clubs into public bars which helped boost attendance figures.

Competitions
Long Story won the Gold Collar to make up for his unlucky exit in the previous years 1960 Irish Greyhound Derby; the black dog had switched kennels from Jim Syder Jr. to Phil Rees. Oregon Prince easily won the Welsh Greyhound Derby while Palms Printer won the Scurry Gold Cup for his new handler Greg Doyle who had replaced Paddy McEvoy at the Clapton Stadium kennels; the veteran greyhound Gorey Airways was denied a third successive Scurry Gold Cup title. Clonalvy Pride finally broke his classic duck at Wimbledon, the April 1958 whelp ran a great race defeating the field that included Palms Printer and Winter Bell. Within two weeks he had also picked up the St Leger at Wembley Greyhounds.

During the Eclipse heats the track record at Lythalls Lane Stadium is broken three times, Faithful Charlie (the eventual competition winner) set a new record of 29.19 followed by Jim's Tour in 29.16 and finally SS Leader in 29.12.

News
John Sutton was handed control of the family-run business at Catford Stadium, following the death of his father Frank Sutton. He would introduce the first Jackpot Pool, later to be copied by horse racing. After the closure of the Knowle track, trainer John Rowe (father of Bob Rowe) joined Oxford Stadium. Within a year he had taken up the position as Racing Manager at Leicester Stadium and his son Bob became Assistant Racing Manager to Charles Boulton at Wandsworth Stadium.

The Greyhound Racing Association introduced under track heating systems at Belle Vue Stadium, Harringay Stadium and White City following a successful trial in Scotland. Electric cables were sewn into the track by the tractor and a team of workers then placed the cables eight inches under the turf. They would prove to be useful until the advent of all sand tracks. Catford and Walthamstow Stadium would continue to use under track systems replacing electric cables with water pipes until the late 1980s.

Former Oxford, Sheffield, Nottingham and Park Royal trainer Frank Schock leaves for Australia and takes a minor open race hound with him called Which Chariot. The greyhound provides a major bloodline in the Australian breeding industry. Five times Derby winning trainer Leslie Reynolds died on 1 August.

Ireland
The Bord na gCon continued the process of upgrading their tracks by installing totalisator systems into seven more tracks.

Principal UK races

	

+Equalled Track Record

References 

Greyhound racing in the United Kingdom
Greyhound racing in the Republic of Ireland
UK and Ireland Greyhound Racing Year
UK and Ireland Greyhound Racing Year
UK and Ireland Greyhound Racing Year
UK and Ireland Greyhound Racing Year